Gong Lake is a lake in Algoma District, Ontario. It is part of the Sayme-Aubinadong-Gong Provincial Park protected area.

See also
List of lakes in Ontario

References

Lakes of Algoma District